Como uma Onda (Like a Wave) is a Brazilian telenovela that was produced and aired by TV Globo from November 22, 2004, and June 18, 2005.

Featured Alinne Moraes, Ricardo Pereira, Henri Castelli, Herson Capri, Maria Fernanda Cândido, Kadu Moliterno, Joana Solnado, Hugo Carvana, Laura Cardoso and Mel Lisboa in the lead roles.

Plot 
At the beginning of the plot, Daniel Cascaes, who was born in the Açores, an impossible love lives with the beautiful and fiery Portuguese Almerinda. The girl's father, Admiral Figueroa conservative, does not accept the courtship of his daughter, and hires thugs to separate the couple. Thus, Daniel decides to escape by disguising himself as tourist guide.

During the flight, he meets the Brazilian businessman Synesius Paiva and his wife, hilarious Dondoca Marileia, along with daughters Nina and Lenita, who soon become interested in the boy. Daniel is also enchanted by Nina, but his heart still beats strong for Almerinda and he is willing to endure everything for his beloved.

Daniel and Almerinda mark the day and time to flee Portugal, but the admiral's henchmen intercept the plane. Beaten and unconscious, Daniel is placed alone in an ocean liner that sailed to Brazil.

Being a stowaway, Daniel gets stuck on the ship by order of the commander. But the sisters Nina and Lenita, who are also returning home, appear once more to help him. So Daniel get rid of the police and throws herself into the sea. The waves eventually lead to far abroad, specifically to a fishing village in Santa Catarina, where he is rescued by a pair of sailors, Jigsaw Chin and Cherub. Suspicious, filthy and ragged, Daniel once again gains the beach and discovers the harsh reality of the streets of a new country, Brazil.

No idea of the whereabouts of lovely Azorean family Paiva returns to Brazil. The rest, however, is quickly consumed by problems in business: Synesius is shocked to discover that is nearly bankrupt. Not bad for the plans of his partner Jorge Junqueira, the dreaded JJ The two share the helm of the company, but have very different profiles. Synesius is a worker who, with much effort, built an empire and became one of the biggest names in the fishing industry. Already JJ took part of the command of the firm after the death of his father, and want to become the largest landowner in the country by sea.

But Daniel and Lenita finds he can to ensure the employment of Butler Marileia. Pivot of a dispute between Nina and Lenita, Daniel walks away memories of Almerinda and increasing concern for Nina. Gradually, the initial provocations between the two gives rise to a large amor.Só true love of Daniel and Nina, will be shaken by Lenita, who is in love with Daniel and will do anything to take the sister of his life. Only Almerinda pregnant arrives in Brazil, ready to rediscover his great love and father of her son, Daniel. However, Lenita vai miserable your life to get her out of the way of Daniel. Lenita is capable of anything, including kill his sister and Almerinda!

In Florianópolis, in a village, the fishermen live. The beautiful Lavinia is a strong woman who lives with her husband and Amarante has a passionate marriage. He found support for this man create his daughter Julia, the result of a relationship of adolescence. His mother Francisquinha, a blind lady, is a kind of matriarch of the village and is always ready to give advice and to resolve conflicts. Among the residents there and hilarious Pedroca womanizer who loves a-tail skirt, while the woman, the battler Idalina, works hard at sewing.

But there is also an intriguing man: Sandoval. Just released from prison, he struggles to regain his dignity in that corner and find a place to rebuild his life.

Cast
 Ricardo Pereira as Daniel Cascaes
 Alinne Moraes as Nina Paiva
 Mel Lisboa as Lenita Paiva
 Henri Castelli as Jorge Junqueira "J.J"
 Herson Capri as Sandoval
 Maria Fernanda Cândido as Lavínia
 Kadu Moliterno as Antônio Amarante
 Hugo Carvana as Sinésio Paiva
 Denise Del Vecchio as Mariléia Paiva
 Laura Cardoso as Francisquinha
 Bianca Byington as Encarnação Junqueira
 Joana Solnado as Almerinda
 Elias Gleizer as Bartolomeu "Old Bartô"
 Tato Gabus Mendes as Pedroca do Espírito Santo
 Louise Cardoso as Idalina "Dala"
 Marcos Caruso as Dr. Prata
 Débora Duarte as Alice Prata
 Gustavo Haddad as Conrado Prata
 Fernanda de Freitas as Amanda
 Débora Olivieri as Ana Amélia
 Ernani Moraes as Lauriclenes "Quebra-Queixo"
 Dudu Azevedo as Querubim
 Maytê Piragibe as Júlia
 Sérgio Marone as Rafael Prata
 Cauã Reymond as Floriano
 Sheron Menezzes as Rosário
 Yaçanã Martins as Jackie
 Mila Moreira as Virgínia Lemos
 Antônio Grassi as Roberto "Robusto" Augusto
 Eduardo Lago as Oswaldo
 Larissa Queiroz as Carolina "Carol" Lemos
 Nill Marcondes as Samuel "Samuca)"
 Amir Haddad as Menez
 Thaís Garayp as Abigail "Biga"
 Sirmar Antunes as Balbino
 Amandha Lee as Ilana
 Paco Sanches as Manjubinha
 Sérgio Malheiros as Franklin "Frank"
 Guta Gonçalves as Gilda "Gigi" Paiva
 Arthur Lopes as Rubico Junqueira 
 Christina Rodrigues as Cliente de Mariléia

External links
 

2004 Brazilian television series debuts
2004 Brazilian television series endings
2004 telenovelas
TV Globo telenovelas
Brazilian telenovelas
Portuguese-language telenovelas